Jagatpur is a village and corresponding community development block in Unchahar tehsil of Rae Bareli district, Uttar Pradesh, India. It is located 18 km from Raebareli, the district headquarters, on the road to Allahabad at the point where it intersects the road from Dalmau to Salon. There is a large Buddhist-era ruin site at Tanghan to the south. As of 2011, Jagatpur has a population of 7,267 people, in 1,336 households. It has 4 primary schools and 1 healthcare centre.

History
During the 19th century, Jagatpur formed part of the taluqdari estate of Rana Beni Madho Bakhsh, who had a major fort at the village of Shankarpur a short distance to the northeast. At the turn of the 20th century, Jagatpur was held by Babu Bhubhanaranjan Mukarji, who was taluqdar of Shankarpur at the time. His predecessor, Raja Dakhinaranjan Mukarji, had founded a dispensary in the village, and Bhubhanaranjan continued to maintain it. The village's population in 1901 was 1,537 people, including a large number of Ahirs. Besides the dispensary, it also had a police station, a post office, a cattle pound, and a large primary school.

The 1961 census recorded Jagatpur as comprising 22 hamlets, with a total population of 2,413 people (1,251 male and 1,162 female), in 528 households and 520 physical houses. The area of the village was given as 1,335 acres and it had a post office at that point. It also had the following small industrial establishments: 5 grain mills, 2 miscellaneous food processing facilities, 5 clothing manufacturers, 2 shoemakers, 1 shoe repairer, and 8 bicycle repair shops. There was a dispensary run by a local body. The village's police staff consisted of 1 sub-inspector, 1 head constable, and 14 constables.

The 1981 census recorded Jagatpur as having a population of 3,487 people, in 741 households, and having an area of 540.26 hectares. The main staple foods were listed as wheat and rice.

Villages
Jagatpur CD block has the following 62 villages:

References

Villages in Raebareli district
Community development blocks in India